The 2004 Hamburg state election was held on 29 February 2004 to elect the members of the 18th Hamburg Parliament. The election was triggered by the collapse of the coalition government between the Christian Democratic Union (CDU), Party for a Rule of Law Offensive (PRO), and Free Democratic Party (FDP). The election saw a collapse in support for PRO which had split after its leader Ronald Schill left in 2003. The original party and Schill's new party captured 3.5% of the vote between them, down from 19.4% in 2001. A huge amount of support flowed to the CDU, which won 63 of the 121 seats in Parliament, forming a majority government. First Mayor Ole von Beust continued in office.

Parties
The table below lists parties represented in the 17th Hamburg Parliament.

Background
In August 2003, Mayor von Beust made moves to dismiss an Interior official suspected of corruption. In response, Senator of the Interior Ronald Schill threatened to spread rumours of an affair between von Beust and the Senator of Justice. Schill was subsequently dismissed from the government. In December of the same year, Schill left his own party along with five of its members of Parliament, depriving the government of its majority. He subsequently joined Pro DM.

Opinion polling

Election result

|-
! colspan="2" | Party
! Votes
! %
! +/-
! Seats 
! +/-
! Seats %
|-
| bgcolor=| 
| align=left | Christian Democratic Union (CDU)
| align=right| 389,170
| align=right| 47.2
| align=right| 21.0
| align=right| 63
| align=right| 30
| align=right| 52.1
|-
| bgcolor=| 
| align=left | Social Democratic Party (SPD)
| align=right| 251,441
| align=right| 30.5
| align=right| 6.0
| align=right| 41
| align=right| 5
| align=right| 33.9
|-
| bgcolor=| 
| align=left | Green Alternative List (GAL)
| align=right| 101,227
| align=right| 12.3
| align=right| 3.7
| align=right| 17
| align=right| 6
| align=right| 14.0
|-
! colspan=8|
|-
|  
| align=left | Pro Deutsche Mitte – Initiative Pro D-Mark (Pro DM)
| align=right| 25,763
| align=right| 3.1
| align=right| 2.9
| align=right| 0
| align=right| ±0
| align=right| 0
|-
| bgcolor=| 
| align=left | Free Democratic Party (FDP)
| align=right| 23,373
| align=right| 2.8
| align=right| 2.3
| align=right| 0
| align=right| 6
| align=right| 0
|-
| bgcolor=#2E8B57|
| align=left | Rainbow – For a new left (REGENBOGEN)
| align=right| 9,200
| align=right| 1.1
| align=right| 0.6
| align=right| 0
| align=right| ±0
| align=right| 0
|-
| bgcolor=grey|
| align=left | The Grays – Gray Panthers (GRAUEN)
| align=right| 8,878
| align=right| 1.1
| align=right| 1.1
| align=right| 0
| align=right| ±0
| align=right| 0
|-
| bgcolor=|
| align=left | Others
| align=right| 15,265
| align=right| 1.9
| align=right| 
| align=right| 0
| align=right| 25
| align=right| 0
|-
! align=right colspan=2| Total
! align=right| 824,317
! align=right| 100.0
! align=right| 
! align=right| 121
! align=right| ±0
! align=right| 
|-
! align=right colspan=2| Voter turnout
! align=right| 
! align=right| 68.7
! align=right| 2.4
! align=right| 
! align=right| 
! align=right| 
|}

See also
Hamburg state elections in the Weimar Republic
2008 Hamburg state election

References

External links 
 The Federal Returning Officer

2004 elections in Germany
2004 state election
2004
February 2004 events in Europe